Landsholdet is the popular name of the Denmark national football team. The name is also used for musical releases in the form of collaborations by Danish association football (soccer) players with Danish known artists. 
Landsholdet is credited for the 2010 song "The Danish Way to Rock" by the Danish band Nephew. The single reached #1 on the Danish Singles Chart for 2 weeks.
Landsholdet is also credited for the 2012 song "Vi vandt i dag" by the Danish hip hop duo Nik & Jay. The single reached #5 in the Danish Singles Chart.

Discography
(Selective and only charting singles)

References

Danish musical groups
Denmark national football team